KAGW-CD (channel 26) is a low-power, Class A television station in Wichita, Kansas, United States, affiliated with several digital multicast networks, including Cozi TV on its main channel. The station is owned by the Great Plains Television Network, LLC, which also operates low-power Heartland-affiliated station KSMI-LD (channel 30) through a local marketing agreement (LMA) with owner Get After It Media. The two stations share offices on South Greenwood Street in Wichita; KAGW-CD's transmitter is located in rural northwestern Sedgwick County (north-northeast of Colwich).

History

The station first signed on the air on June 6, 1998 as K53EO, broadcasting on UHF channel 53. It was originally an affiliate of both America's Voice and ZDTV. On November 16, 1998, the station's call letters were changed to KTQW-LP, in reference to its slogan "Total Quality Wichita". At first, it was the sole broadcast affiliate of the otherwise cable and satellite network that evolved into TechTV, carrying the network's programming 20 hours a day, with the remaining four hours allocated to locally produced programs. The station relocated its signal to UHF channel 49 on June 10, 2004, and upgraded its license to Class A status, modifying its call sign to KTQW-CA.

In 2006, Knowledge LC sold the station to Great Plains Television Network, LLC; the sale was approved by the Federal Communications Commission (FCC) on December 14, 2006, and was completed one week later on December 21. On January 8, 2007, the station's call letters were officially changed to KGPT-CA to match the name of the company, Kansas Great Plains Television Network. The station has applied to increase its effective radiated power from 4.8 to 13.91 kilowatts.

On August 6, 2013, at 1:30 p.m., the station moved its signal to UHF channel 26 and began operating its digital signal from a newly constructed transmission tower located north-northeast of Colwich; the station also increased its effective radiated power to 15 kilowatts, resulting in a significant increase in the station's coverage area.

A Kansas court ordered the station into receivership in December 2020 after former owner Urban Investment Broadcasting sued, claiming GPTN had failed to meet the terms of the promissory note it had used to acquire the station; Tyler Brown was appointed as receiver. On July 1, 2021, the call sign changed to KAGW-CD. On July 4, the station rebranded to KAGW 26 (KAGW stands for Keep America Great Wichita, while their slogan is actually Keep America Great Kansas).

The station slogan is a variation of the "Keep America Great" slogan used in Donald Trump's campaign during the 2020 presidential election.

Programming
Formerly, In addition to carrying programming from eight networks on its digital subchannels, the station also produced locally produced programs (such as WichitaLiberty.TV and Ascension Café).

Yellow Ribbons from Home
KAGW also produced a special saluting U.S. military personnel and their families titled Yellow Ribbons From Home, which aired on July 4, 2007. The special included video greetings to the military members from their families, then-Governor Kathleen Sebelius, Senators Pat Roberts and Sam Brownback and all four of Kansas' Congressional representatives, as well as former Senator Bob Dole and Wichita mayor Carl Brewer. Country musicians including Darryl Worley, Blake Shelton, Emerson Drive, Terri Clark and Heartland also sent greetings and provided special performances. The special was also streamed and later offered on-demand on the station's website, allowing its viewing by members of the military stationed elsewhere around the world. On June 22, 2007, Governor Sebelius proclaimed July as Yellow Ribbons From Home Month, in commemoration of the special.

Technical information

Subchannels
The station's signal is multiplexed:

References

External links
 Official website
Broadcast TV: A lot to see for free

Independent television stations in the United States
Cozi TV affiliates
Bounce TV affiliates
WeatherNation TV affiliates
TheGrio affiliates
Buzzr affiliates
Quest (American TV network) affiliates
NewsNet affiliates
AGW-CD
Television channels and stations established in 1998
1998 establishments in Kansas
Low-power television stations in the United States